The 2008-09 Scottish Women's League Division 1 was the 9th season of the Scottish Women's Football League First Division. Ten teams contested the league the champions and runners up promoted to the Scottish Women's Premier League to compete in the 2009-10 season. The bottom two teams were relegated to the Scottish Women's League Regional Divisions Scottish Women's League Division 2 East and Scottish Women's League Division 2 South West to compete in the 2009-10 season.

Clubs

Results

Final league table

Positions by round

Matches

Sunday Saturday 23/08/2008 to Sunday 23/05/2009

References

Scottish Women's Football League
2008 in women's association football
2009 in women's association football